A sculpin is a type of fish that belongs to the superfamily Cottoidea in the order Scorpaeniformes. As of 2006, this superfamily contains 7 families, 94 genera, and 387 species.

Sculpins occur in many types of habitat, including ocean and freshwater zones. They live in rivers, submarine canyons, kelp forests, and shallow littoral habitat types, such as tidepools.

Sculpins are benthic fish, dwelling on the bottoms of water bodies. Their pectoral fins are smooth on the upper edge and webbed with sharp rays along the lower edge, a modification that makes them specialized for gripping the substrate. This adaptation helps the fish anchor in fast-flowing water. The sculpin normally grows to about four inches long.

Families and subfamilies
Families include:

 Jordaniidae Starks, 1895
 Rhamphocottidae Jordan & Gilbert, 1883
 Scorpaenichthyidae Jordan & Evermann, 1898
 Agonidae Swainson, 1839
 Hemilepidontinae Jordan & Evermann, 1898
 Hemitripterinae Gill, 1856
 Bothragoninae Lindberg, 1971
 Hypsagoninae Gill, 1861
 Anoplagoninae Gill, 1861
 Brachyopsinae Jordan & Evermann, 1898
 Agoninae Swainson, 1839
 Bathyagoninae Lindberg, 1971
 Cottidae Bonaparte, 1831
 Cottinae Bonaparte, 1831
 Comephorinae Bonaparte 1850
 Abyssocottinae Berg, 1907
 Psychrolutidae Günther, 1861
 Cottunculinae Regan, 1913
 Psychrolutinae Günther, 1861
 Bathylutichthyidae Balushkin & Voskoboinikova, 1990

Gallery

References

Cottoidei
 
Fish of Greenland